Saint-Donat Airfield was a World War II military airfield in Algeria, located near Tadjenanet in Mila Province; approximately 63 km southwest of Constantine. It was used by the United States Army Air Force Twelfth Air Force as a heavy bomber (B-17 Flying Fortress) airfield during the North African Campaign.  Known units assigned to the field were:

 301st Bombardment Group, 6 March-6 August 1943, B-17 Flying Fortress

Due to the limited amount of aerial photography available, it is not possible to precisely determine the location and condition of the airfield today.

See also
 Boeing B-17 Flying Fortress airfields in the Mediterranean Theater of Operations

References

 Maurer, Maurer. Air Force Combat Units of World War II. Maxwell AFB, Alabama: Office of Air Force History, 1983. .
 
 USAFHRA search for Saint-Donat Airfield

External links

Airfields of the United States Army Air Forces in Algeria
World War II airfields in Algeria
Airports established in 1942
1942 establishments in Algeria
1943 disestablishments in Algeria